Scoparia niphospora is a moth in the family Crambidae. It is endemic to New Zealand.

Taxonomy

This species was described by Edward Meyrick in 1884. Meyrick gave a more detailed description of the species in 1885. Meyrick placed this species within the genus Scopaira in 1913. However the placement of this species within Scoparia is in doubt. As a result, this species has also been referred to as Scoparia (s.l.) niphospora.

Description

The wingspan is 26–29 mm. The forewings are light greyish-ochreous, irrorated with white except along the costa. The costa are dark fuscous with a few scattered dark fuscous scales. The veins are somewhat marked with dark fuscous posteriorly. There is a hindmarginal row of black dots. The hindwings are very pale whitish-ochreous. Adults have been recorded on wing in January.

References

Moths described in 1884
Scorparia
Moths of New Zealand
Endemic fauna of New Zealand
Taxa named by Edward Meyrick
Endemic moths of New Zealand